Eugen Neufeld (6 December 1882 in Göding – 18 October 1950 in Vienna) was an Austrian-Jewish film actor. He was the older brother of actor and director Max Neufeld.

Selected filmography
 The Priest from Kirchfeld (1914)
 The Ancestress (1919)
 Light of His Life (1921)
 The Woman in White (1921)
 The Dead Wedding Guest (1922)
 East and West (1923)
 The Iron King (1923)
 The Tales of Hoffmann (1923)
 The City Without Jews (1924)
 Gulliver's Travels (1924)
 Colonel Redl (1925)
 A Waltz by Strauss (1925)
 Sons in Law (1926)
 The Arsonists of Europe (1926)
 Her Highness Dances the Waltz (1926)
 Alpine Tragedy (1927)
 The Bordello in Rio (1927)
 German Women - German Faithfulness (1927)
 The Beloved of His Highness (1928)
 At Ruedesheimer Castle There Is a Lime Tree (1928)
 The Most Beautiful Woman in Paris (1928)
 When the Guard Marches (1928)
  A Girl with Temperament (1928)
 Strauss Is Playing Today (1928)
 Love in the Cowshed (1928)
  Ship of Girls (1929)
 Victoria and Her Hussar (1931)
 Without Meyer, No Celebration is Complete (1931)
 Der Diamant des Zaren (1932)
 A Star Fell from Heaven (1934)
 Her Highness Dances the Waltz (1935)
 Viennese Melodies (1947)
 Anni (1948)
 Beloved of the World (1949)

References

Bibliography
 Jung, Uli & Schatzberg, Walter. Beyond Caligari: The Films of Robert Wiene. Berghahn Books, 1999.

External links

1882 births
1950 deaths
People from Hodonín
People from the Margraviate of Moravia
Austrian Jews
Jewish Austrian male actors
Austrian male film actors
Austrian male silent film actors
20th-century Austrian male actors